A gangster is a member of a gang (often an organized crime syndicate).

Gangster or gangsters may also refer to:

Arts, entertainment, and media

Films and television
Miracles (1989 film), a Hong Kong film released in the Philippines as Gangster
Gangster (1994 film), a Hindi-language Indian film
Gangster: A Love Story, a 2006 Hindi-language Indian film
Gangster, also known as The Wee Man, a 2013 Scottish film
Gangster (2014 film), a Malayalam-language Indian film
Gangster (2016 film), a Bengali-language Indian film
Gangsters (1992 film), a 1992 Italian film
The Gangster (1947 film), a film noir starring Barry Sullivan
The Gangster (1965 film), a Mexican film
The Gangster (2012 film), a Thai drama action film
The Gangsters, a 1913 film starring Roscoe "Fatty" Arbuckle
Gangster (film series), a 1998 Bollywood crime thriller film series
Gangsters (TV series), a 1970s BBC show

Games
Gangster Town, a video game for the Sega Master System
Gangster!, 1979 role-playing game published by Fantasy Games Unlimited
Gangsters: Organized Crime, computer game by Eidos Interactive

Literature
Gangster (novel), a 2001 novel by Lorenzo Carcaterra
Gangsters (novel), a 2005 novel by Klas Östergren
The Gangster (novel), a 2016 novel by Clive Cussler

Music
"Gangsters" (song), 1979 UK top ten-single by The Specials
"Gangsters", song by rapper Wiley from Playtime Is Over
"Gangster", song by Ima Robot featured in the film "Break Point".

Other uses
El Gangster, nickname of Puerto Rican celebrity, Antonio Sánchez
Gin Gangster, a South Korean paraglider design

See also 
Gang (disambiguation)
Gangsta (disambiguation)